Thomas J. Hitchcock (born May 14, 1864) was an American politician from Maryland. He served as a member of the Maryland House of Delegates, representing Harford County, from 1904 to 1905.

Early life
Thomas J. Hitchcock was born on May 14, 1864, at Upper Cross Roads in Harford County, Maryland, to Mary E. Hitchcock. He attended public schools in the county.

Career
Hitchcock worked as a farmer and merchant.

Hitchcock was a Democrat. Hitchcock served as a member of the Maryland House of Delegates, representing Harford County, from 1904 to 1905. He was defeated in the 1905 election by Edmund L. Oldfield.

References

1864 births
Year of death missing
People from Harford County, Maryland
Democratic Party members of the Maryland House of Delegates
Farmers from Maryland